WCCF (1580 kHz) is an AM radio station broadcasting a news/talk format. Licensed to Punta Gorda, Florida, United States, the station is owned by iHeartMedia, Inc. WCCF carries Tampa Bay Buccaneers American football and Tampa Bay Rays baseball games along with The Clay Travis and Buck Sexton Show, and Coast To Coast AM.

1580 AM is a Canadian clear-channel frequency.

External links

CCF
Radio stations established in 1961
IHeartMedia radio stations
1961 establishments in Florida
News and talk radio stations in the United States